Danzig German are Northeastern German dialects spoken in Gdańsk, Poland. It forms part of the Low Prussian dialect that was spoken in the region before the mass-expulsion of the speakers following the end of World War II. Nowadays, Danzig German is only passed within families. Famous modern speakers are Günter Grass, Klaus Kinski, and Donald Tusk.

History
In the 12th century, a German merchant settlement in the area of today's Long Market of Gdansk arose, close to a Prussian-Kashubian settlement, creating a language contact between Slavic languages, Baltic languages, and Germanic languages. The settlement attracted more German settlers, mainly from Lower Saxony, Westphalia and Hannover, whose Low German language became the dominating language. As subject of the Teutonic Order the town grew to a German town granted Magdeburg law.

As part of the  Hanseatic League, the town acquired a Platt dialect that also derived elements from the Dutch, Prussian, and from local Kashubian and Polish language as well. For example,  (cod),  (boar) are borrowings from the Polish language.

The city's official communication employed Low German until 1563, when a letter in Low German was sent to Nieuport, while neighboring Elbing and Braunsberg had switched to High German by the middle of the 15th century. With the spread of High German through education, Danzig Platt was spoken only by a small fraction of the city's population. Still, Danzig Platt literature started to evolve at the end of the 18th century.

After having switched to High German, the major part of the town came to speak . When Danzig became loyal to Poland along with Royal Prussia, German was maintained as the town's language.

Linguistic properties 

Danzig Platt deviated significantly from North German Platt.

Danzig Missingsch 

Danzig Missingsch employs spirantization of initial "g" to "j" in e.g.  (walked) instead of High German .

Literature

References

German dialects
History of Gdańsk
Low German
City colloquials